Kasali Olayinka Olatunda Casal (born 21 October 1987) is a former professional footballer who played as a left-back or left winger. He is a dual citizen of the United Kingdom and Nigeria.

Career
Born in London and raised in the North West area of London, Casal joined the Fulham youth academy in 2003 at the age of 16 and earned a spot on the full team reserve side two years later. Casal had been the leading scorer for Fulham's reserve team for the 2005–06 season.

In March 2007 Major League Soccer club D.C. United signed Casal to a senior contract. In July he left the club. Then he signed for Dutch side Cambuur Leeuwarden.

On 6 August 2008, Casal signed a two-year deal with Swindon Town for an undisclosed fee, after a successful trial. He made his debut for Swindon against Tranmere Rovers on the opening day of the 2008–09 season. He left Swindon by mutual consent on 12 January 2010.

On 13 January 2010, Casal signed for Romanian club CFR Cluj. He was injured in a friendly match played in Antalya and the injury was wrongly diagnosed by the medical staff. In February he went on loan to Gaz Metan Mediaş, but in early March returned to Cluj.

Personal life
In his youth he was an athlete and was on a 4x100 relay team that as of 5 September 1999 holds the British U-13 record (50.32 seconds).

References

1987 births
Living people
Footballers from Greater London
English sportspeople of Nigerian descent
English people of Yoruba descent
Yoruba sportspeople
Nigerian footballers
English expatriate footballers
English footballers
Nigerian expatriate footballers
D.C. United players
Major League Soccer players
SC Cambuur players
Swindon Town F.C. players
English Football League players
CFR Cluj players
Liga I players
CS Gaz Metan Mediaș players
Vasas SC players
FC Etar 1924 Veliko Tarnovo players
First Professional Football League (Bulgaria) players
Black British sportspeople
Expatriate footballers in Romania
Expatriate footballers in Hungary
Expatriate footballers in Bulgaria
Nigerian expatriate sportspeople in Romania
Nigerian expatriate sportspeople in Hungary
Association football defenders
English expatriate sportspeople in the United States
Expatriate soccer players in the United States